Bruce Cooper Clarke (April 29, 1901 – March 17, 1988) was a United States Army general. He was a career officer who served in World War I, World War II, and the Korean War. He was the commander of Continental Army Command from 1958 to 1960, Commander, United States Army Europe from 1960 to 1962, and commanded the United States Army, Pacific from December 1954 to April 1956.

Early life and education
Clarke was born on a farm in Adams, New York, on April 29, 1901. He dropped out of high school to enlist in the United States Army in 1917, served in the Coast Artillery Corps during World War I, and gained appointment to the United States Military Academy through the New York National Guard. He graduated in 1925 with a commission in the Corps of Engineers. In addition to his degree from West Point, he earned a civil engineering degree from Cornell University and an LL.B. from La Salle Extension University. He also was an equivalent graduate of the National War College and is credited with starting the Non-Commissioned Officers Academy system.

Military career
In the Second World War, as a colonel and then a brigadier general, he commanded Combat Command A (CCA) of the 4th Armored Division in General George S. Patton's Third Army, leading it to victory over a superior German armored force at the Battle of Arracourt in September 1944. In December Clarke led the relief of St. Vith during the Battle of the Bulge, which slowed the German attack. Writing afterward, General Eisenhower credited Clarke's actions as the "turning point" in that battle.

During the Korean War, Clarke commanded the 1st Armored Division, Fort Hood, Texas, from 1951 to 1953. He then transferred to Korea, where he commanded I Corps in 1953 and X Corps from 1953 to 1954. He also trained the First Republic of Korea Army.

Clarke was then assigned as Commanding General, United States Army Pacific in Hawaii from 1954 to 1956. After his tour in Hawaii, he commanded the Seventh United States Army in Germany from 1956 to 1958. He received a promotion to the rank of four-star general in August 1958. From 1958 to 1960 he commanded the Continental Army Command, heading the entire Army school system which, at the time, had over 250,000 participants.  From 1960 to 1962 he served as Commander in Chief of United States Army Europe, before retiring on April 30, 1962.

On October 18, 1971, the Supreme Council of the Scottish Rite for the Southern Jurisdiction of the United States conferred upon Clarke, a 33rd Degree Freemason, the Grand Cross of the Court of Honor. This is the highest Masonic award, with only 11 holders out of 600,000 Freemasons in the Southern Jurisdiction of the Scottish Rite.

Military decorations
Clarke's military decorations include the Distinguished Service Cross, three Army Distinguished Service Medals, three Silver Stars, the Legion of Merit, and three Bronze Star Medals. He also received decorations from foreign countries including France, Germany, Great Britain, Korea, and the Philippines.

  Distinguished Service Cross
  Army Distinguished Service Medal with two oak leaf clusters
  Silver Star with two oak leaf clusters
  Legion of Merit
  Bronze Star with two oak leaf clusters and "V" Device
  Air Medal
  Victory Medal
  American Defense Service Medal
  American Campaign Medal
  European-African-Middle Eastern Campaign Medal with four campaign stars
  World War II Victory Medal
  Army of Occupation Medal
  Korean Service Medal with two campaign stars
  United Nations Korea Medal

Death and burial
Clarke died after a stroke on March 17, 1988, at Walter Reed Army Medical Center and was buried with full military honors in Section 7-A (Grave 130) at Arlington National Cemetery. His wife, Bessie Mitchell Clarke, is buried with him.

Bibliography
 Guidelines for the Leader and the Commander. 1968. Stackpole Books.

See also

List of United States Army four-star generals
List of recipients of the Silver Buffalo Award
List of lieutenant generals in the United States Army before 1960
List of La Salle Extension University people
List of commanders of I Corps (United States)

References

 Arlington National Cemetery
Generals of World War II

United States Military Academy alumni
Recipients of the Distinguished Service Cross (United States)
Recipients of the Distinguished Service Medal (US Army)
Recipients of the Silver Star
Recipients of the Legion of Merit
Cornell University College of Engineering alumni
La Salle Extension University alumni
Recipients of the Croix de Guerre (France)
Grand Crosses with Star and Sash of the Order of Merit of the Federal Republic of Germany
People from Adams, New York
1901 births
1988 deaths
Burials at Arlington National Cemetery
United States Army personnel of World War I
United States Army Corps of Engineers personnel
United States Army generals of World War II
United States Army generals